Tajuria megistia, the black royal is a species of lycaenid or blue butterfly found in the Indomalayan realm.

Subspecies
T. m. megistia Assam
T. m. thria  de Nicéville, [1896]  Burma, Peninsular Malaya, Sumatra

References

Tajuria
Butterflies described in 1869